In the mathematical  surgery theory the surgery exact sequence is the main technical tool to calculate the surgery structure set of a compact manifold in dimension .

The basic idea is that in order to calculate  it is enough to understand the other terms in the sequence, which are usually easier to determine. These are on one hand the normal invariants which form generalized cohomology groups, and hence one can use standard tools of algebraic topology to calculate them at least in principle. On the other hand, there are the L-groups which are defined algebraically in terms of quadratic forms or in terms of chain complexes with quadratic structure. A great deal is known about these groups. Another part of the sequence are the surgery obstruction maps from normal invariants to the L-groups. For these maps there are certain characteristic classes formulas, which enable to calculate them in some cases. Knowledge of these three components, that means: the normal maps, the L-groups and the surgery obstruction maps is enough to determine the structure set (at least up to extension problems).

In practice one has to proceed case by case, for each manifold  it is a unique task to determine the surgery exact sequence, see some examples below. Also note that there are versions of the surgery exact sequence depending on the category of manifolds we work with: smooth (DIFF), PL, or topological manifolds and whether we take Whitehead torsion into account or not (decorations  or ).

The original 1962 work of Browder and Novikov on the existence and uniqueness of manifolds within a simply-connected homotopy type was reformulated by Sullivan in 1966 as a surgery exact sequence.
In 1970 Wall developed non-simply-connected surgery theory and the surgery exact sequence for manifolds with arbitrary fundamental group.

Definition

The surgery exact sequence is defined as

 

where:

the arrows  and  will be explained below.

Versions
There are various versions of the surgery exact sequence. One can work in either of the three categories of manifolds: differentiable (smooth), PL, topological.

The entries

Normal invariants

Two such maps are equivalent if there exists a normal bordism between them (that means a bordism of the sources covered by suitable bundle data). The equivalence classes of degree one normal maps are called normal invariants.

However the Pontrjagin-Thom construction gives  a structure of an abelian group. In fact we have a non-natural bijection

 

where  denotes the homotopy fiber of the map , which is an infinite loop space and hence maps into it define a generalized cohomology theory. There are corresponding identifications of the normal invariants with  when working with PL-manifolds and with  when working with topological manifolds.

L-groups

The -groups are defined algebraically in terms of quadratic forms or in terms of chain complexes with quadratic structure. See the main article for more details. Here only the properties of the L-groups described below will be important.

Surgery obstruction maps

The map  is in the first instance a set-theoretic map (that means not necessarily a homomorphism) with the following property (when :

The normal invariants arrow 

Any homotopy equivalence  defines a degree one normal map.

The surgery obstruction arrow 

This arrow describes in fact an action of the group  on the set  rather than just a map. The definition is based on the realization theorem for the elements of the -groups which reads as follows:

Then there exists a degree one normal map of manifolds with boundary

 

with the following properties:

1. 

2.  is a diffeomorphism

3.  is a homotopy equivalence of closed manifolds

The exactness

Recall that the surgery structure set is only a pointed set and that the surgery obstruction map  might not be a homomorphism. Hence it is necessary to explain what is meant when talking about the "exact sequence". So the surgery exact sequence is an exact sequence in the following sense:

For a normal invariant  we have  if and only if . For two manifold structures  we have  if and only if there exists  such that . For an element  we have  if and only if .

Versions revisited

In the topological category the surgery obstruction map can be made into a homomorphism. This is achieved by putting an alternative abelian group structure on the normal invariants as described here. Moreover, the surgery exact sequence can be identified with the algebraic surgery exact sequence of Ranicki which is an exact sequence of abelian groups by definition. This gives the structure set  the structure of an abelian group. Note, however, that there is to this date no satisfactory geometric description of this abelian group structure.

Classification of manifolds
The answer to the organizing questions of the surgery theory can be formulated in terms of the surgery exact sequence. In both cases the answer is given in the form of a two-stage obstruction theory.

The existence question. Let  be a finite Poincaré complex. It is homotopy equivalent to a manifold if and only if the following two conditions are satisfied. Firstly,  must have a vector bundle reduction of its Spivak normal fibration. This condition can be also formulated as saying that the set of normal invariants  is non-empty. Secondly, there must be a normal invariant  such that . Equivalently, the surgery obstruction map  hits .

The uniqueness question. Let  and  represent two elements in the surgery structure set . The question whether they represent the same element can be answered in two stages as follows. Denote the normal cobordism .

Quinn's surgery fibration
In his thesis written under the guidance of Browder, Frank Quinn introduced a fiber sequence so that the surgery long exact sequence is the induced sequence on homotopy groups.

Examples

1. Homotopy spheres

This is an example in the smooth category, .

The idea of the surgery exact sequence is implicitly present already in the original article of Kervaire and Milnor on the groups of homotopy spheres. In the present terminology we have

 

 the cobordism group of almost framed  manifolds, 

 where  mod  (recall the -periodicity of the L-groups)

The surgery exact sequence in this case is an exact sequence of abelian groups. In addition to the above identifications we have

Because the odd-dimensional L-groups are trivial one obtains these exact sequences:

 

 

 

The results of Kervaire and Milnor are obtained by studying the middle map in the first two sequences and by relating the groups  to stable homotopy theory.

2. Topological spheres

The generalized Poincaré conjecture in dimension  can be phrased as saying that . It has been proved for any  by the work of Smale, Freedman and Perelman.

 

is an isomorphism.

3. Complex projective spaces in the topological category

In addition it is known that in the case  in the topological category the surgery obstruction map  is always surjective. Hence we have

 

From the work of Sullivan one can calculate

  and hence

4. Aspherical manifolds in the topological category

Hence the only non-trivial homotopy group is 

One way to state the Borel conjecture is to say that for such  we have that the Whitehead group  is trivial and that

 

The statement is equivalent to showing that the surgery obstruction map to the right of the surgery structure set is injective and the surgery obstruction map to the left of the surgery structure set is surjective. Most of the proofs of the above-mentioned results are done by studying these maps or by studying the assembly maps with which they can be identified. See more details in Borel conjecture, Farrell-Jones Conjecture.

References

Surgery theory